Craig Dudley (born 12 September 1979) is an English footballer who has played for Notts County (where he spent loan spells at Shrewsbury Town, Hull City and Telford United), Oldham Athletic (where he spent loan spells at Chesterfield and Scunthorpe United), Burton Albion, Hyde United and Ashton United.

Retired from playing due to injury and became a full-time driving instructor.

External links

Notts County Players - Where Are They Now?

References

1979 births
Living people
English footballers
Notts County F.C. players
Shrewsbury Town F.C. players
Hull City A.F.C. players
Telford United F.C. players
Oldham Athletic A.F.C. players
Chesterfield F.C. players
Scunthorpe United F.C. players
Burton Albion F.C. players
Hyde United F.C. players
Ashton United F.C. players
Sportspeople from Newark-on-Trent
Footballers from Nottinghamshire
Association football forwards